
Lesko County is a unit of territorial administration and local government (powiat) in Subcarpathian Voivodeship, south-eastern Poland, on the Slovak border. It was created in 2002 out of five gminas which previously made up the western part of Bieszczady County.

As of 2019 its total population is 26,532, out of which the population of Lesko is 5,424, and the rural population is 21,108.

Neighbouring counties
Lesko County is bordered by Sanok County to the west, Przemyśl County to the north and Bieszczady County to the east. It also borders Slovakia to the south.

Administrative division
The county is subdivided into five gminas (one urban-rural and four rural). These are listed in the following table, in descending order of population.

Gallery

References

Lesko County
Lesko